The Global Intelligence Forum is an annual conference dedicated to exploring best practices in intelligence analysis. The conference takes place in Dungarvan, Ireland, the sister city of Erie, Pennsylvania, home of Mercyhurst College, the Mercyhurst College Institute for Intelligence Studies, and the Center for Intelligence Research Analysis and Training (CIRAT).

Background
Mercyhurst University faculty created the conference to explore best practices in intelligence analysis. The founders feel that intelligence as a field of study is best explored through a holistic and global purview. Therefore, gathering intelligence professionals from around the world in a variety of disciplines to speak on their experiences and methods can provide insight into how best to perform quality intelligence analysis.

Future conferences will continue to focus on analytic best practices but will expand to explore intelligence as an enterprise essential to organizational leadership and learning.

2010 Conference

Speakers
The speakers at the 2010 conference included members of the Mercyhurst College faculty, Irish and British government officials, and executives from private intelligence firms. The keynote speaker was former governor of Pennsylvania and first Secretary of Homeland Security Tom Ridge.
 Dermot Ahern T.D., former Minister for Justice and Law Reform
 Sean Alyward, Secretary General, Department of Justice and Equality
 James Breckenridge, Dean, Walker School of Business; Chair, Department of Intelligence Studies, Mercyhurst College, Erie, Pennsylvania, United States
 Anthony Campbell, Coordinator of the Global Futures Forum Community of Interest on the Practice and Organization of Intelligence; Former Head of Intelligence Assessment Secretariat, Privy Council Office, Canada
 John Deasy, Teachta Dála, Waterford Constituency, Ireland
 Dennis Dirkmaat, Diplomat, American Board of Forensic Anthropology; Director, Department of Applied Forensic Sciences, Mercyhurst College, Erie, PA, United States
 Liam Fahey, Adjunct Professor of Strategic Management, Babson College Wellesley, Massachusetts, United States; Executive Director, Leadership Forum Inc.
 Robert J. Heibel, Executive Director, Mercyhurst College Institute for Intelligence Studies
 Georgia Holmer, Pherson Associates, LLC
 Erik Kleinsmith, Program Director, Intelligence Analysis Training, Lockheed Martin; Former US Army Armour and Intelligence Officer - South Riding, Virginia, United States
 Justyna Krajewska, Project Manager, Amsterdam in Business, Amsterdam, Holland
 Catherine Lotrionte, Associate Director of the Institute for Law, Science and Global Security, Georgetown University; Former Counsel to the President's Foreign Intelligence Advisory Board, White House, Washington, DC, United States
 Mark M. Lowenthal, President and CEO of the Intelligence and Security Academy, LLC., Reston, Virginia, United States
 Stephen Marrin, Lecturer, Brunel University, West London, United Kingdom
 Don McDowell, Director, The Intelligence Study Centre, New South Wales, Australia
 Maxie McFarland, former Deputy Chief of Staff, Intelligence U.S. Army Training and Doctrine Command, Fort Monroe, Virginia, United States
 William McGill, Assistant Professor of Information Sciences and Technology at the Pennsylvania State University; Former intelligence officer with the Defense Intelligence Agency in Washington, DC, United States
 Commissioner Fachtna Murphy, Commissioner of the Garda Síochána (Ireland’s National Police Service)
 Michael Murphy, Enterprise Ireland
 Ray O’Dwyer, County Manager, Waterford County Council
 Chris Pallaris, Head of OSINT, International Relations and Security Network (ISN), Zürich, Switzerland
 Joseph Pesce, CEO, Omnis, Inc., McLean, Virginia, United States
 Randy Pherson, President, Pherson Associates, LLC., Reston, Virginia, United States
 Jim Poole, Head of Analytical Capability and Outreach, Professional Head of Intelligence Analysis, UK Cabinet Office, London, United Kingdom
 Jim Power, Chief Economist, Friends First Group; Professor, Finance and Economics on the Local Government MBA, Dublin City University; Professor of Economics on the Executive MBA, Michael Smurfit Graduate Business School - Dublin, Ireland
 Justine Marut Schober, Visiting Professor, Rockefeller University; Director of Academic Research, Hamot Medical Center; Pediatric Urologist, Hamot Medical Center, Erie, Pennsylvania, United States
 Kristan Wheaton, Associate Professor, Mercyhurst College, Erie, Pennsylvania, United States
 Mark Williams, Chief Technology Officer of Eastport Analytics, Arlington, Virginia, United States

Topics
The topics at the 2010 Global Intelligence Forum looked at best practices in intelligence analysis in the national security, law enforcement, and competitive arenas.
Intelligence Analysis: The Business Context (Liam Fahey)
Intelligence in Medicine (Dr. Justin Schober)
Astrophysical Best Practices & Intelligence Analysis (Dr. Joseph Pesce, Ph.D.)
Information in Economics and Finance (Jim Power)
Terrorism and Internet (Maura Conway)
PINS: Intelligence and Offender Management (Derek Lister)
Structured Analysis for Security Risk Management (William L. McGill, Ph.D., PE)
Best Practices for Technology Support to Analytic Best Practices (Mark A. Williams, Ph.D.)
Improving Intelligence Analysis by Looking to the Medical Profession (Stephen Marrin, Ph.D.)
Learning Best Practices from other Domains (Jim Poole)
Seven Deadly Sins and Seven Cardinal Virtues of Analytical Best Practices (Anthony Campbell)
From Intelligence to Policy — Creating a Perfect Business Climate in the Amsterdam Metropolitan Area (Justyna Krajewski)
The Trouble with Best Practices (Chris Pallaris)
Teaching Intelligence Best Practices (Erik Kleinsmith)
Sharing the Findings: The Challenge for Strategic Analysts to Justify and Explain Themselves (Dom McDowell)
How to Identify, Evaluate, and Teach Best Analytic Practices (Randy Pherson)
Teaching Strategic Intelligence Through Games (Kristan J. Wheaton)

Future Conferences
The 2011 Global Intelligence Forum is scheduled for 10–12 July 2011, in Dungarvan, Ireland.

See also
Mercyhurst College
Mercyhurst College Institute for Intelligence Studies

References
 
 
Intelligence analysis
International conferences
Mercyhurst University